D73 may refer to:
 D 73 road (United Arab Emirates), a road in Dubai connecting Jumeirah and running south-eastward perpendicular to D 94
 HMS Pursuer (D73), a 1942 Bogue-class aircraft carrier
 Neo-Grünfeld Defence, Encyclopaedia of Chess Openings code